Neal Bledsoe (born March 26, 1981) is a Canadian and American actor, writer, and filmmaker.

Early life
Bledsoe was born in Toronto, but grew up in Seattle, Washington. Both of his grandfathers served in the Air Force during World War II and his maternal grandfather was awarded the Distinguished Flying Cross for his part in the bombing of the Nazi oil refinery at Ploiești. His mother was a life insurance underwriter and estate planner before becoming an executive for a company that worked all over the world. His father has a PhD in Sociology from the University of Toronto where he studied under the philosopher Marshall McLuhan.

He moved fourteen times around Seattle area growing up, living in Magnolia, Ballard, Fremont, Edmonds, Magnolia again, Ravenna, Downtown, Queen Anne, West Seattle, Queen Anne again, Fremont again, Queen Anne a third time, Bainbridge Island and Capitol Hill. He attended Roosevelt High School (Seattle) and Garfield High School (Seattle) in Seattle, including a brief stint at Ascent within the CEDU system of schools, before finally graduating from the Shawnigan Lake School and then spending a post-graduate year at the Idyllwild Arts Academy, to grow as an actor and a writer. It was at the last of these two schools where he began to first publish his writing.

He went on to study at the prestigious North Carolina School of the Arts where he was mentored by the renowned theater director, Gerald Freedman, earning a BFA in 2005.

Career

Actor
Bledsoe got a quick start out of school, booking a pilot opposite Kelly Lynch less than a month after leaving school. He worked steadily for the next few years, until he had his breakthrough in 2009 on Gossip Girl and Ugly Betty. He then went on to star on the shows Law and Order: SVU, Smash, Ironside, The Man in the High Castle, The Mysteries of Laura, Timeless, Code Black and most recently, Shameless.

He has won several awards for his work in independent films such as Junction, West End and After the Sun Fell. He also has appeared in both Revolutionary Road and Sex and the City 2 in blink-and-you'll-miss-him types of roles. Recently, he starred opposite Val Kilmer in the western A Soldier's Revenge.

On the stage, he worked on the Broadway production of Impressionism, the world premiere of Stephen Wadsworth's Figaro Plays at the McCarter Theatre and Michael Arden's award-winning production of The Pride at the Wallis Annenberg Center for the Performing Arts.

He appeared in several campaigns for Tiffany and Co, opposite Dutch model, Doutzen Kroes.

He also was an Old Spice Man.

In December 2022, Bledsoe announced that he was leaving the Great American Family network because of their anti-LGBTQ stance. Bledsoe stated, "the thought that my work could be used to deliberately discriminate against anyone horrifies and infuriates me."

Writer
As a writer, he has written films, poems, short stories, cartoons, essays and articles . In 2014, he became a contributor to Sports Illustrated's MMQB. His long-form series, The Delicate Moron, chronicled his attempt to play for the Los Angeles Kiss of the Arena Football League. Recently, he published a profile in Men's Health magazine on former NFL running back and Ballers writer, Rashard Mendenhall.

Filmmaker
In 2015, he received a commission to write and direct and star in the short film Primary. The film examines the subject of open relationships and was heavily influenced by the work of John Cassavetes, Esther Perel and Helen Fisher, as well as months of extensive interviews with a diverse range of people from across the relationship spectrum.

Filmography

Film

Television

References

External links
 
 
 

1981 births
21st-century Canadian male actors
21st-century American male actors
American male film actors
American male musical theatre actors
American male soap opera actors
American male television actors
Canadian expatriate male actors in the United States
Canadian male film actors
Canadian male musical theatre actors
Canadian male soap opera actors
Canadian male television actors
Living people
Male actors from Seattle
Male actors from Toronto
University of North Carolina School of the Arts alumni